Tomoko Okano (岡野知子 Okano Tomoko, born August 29, 1979) is a former Japanese volleyball player. She served as the captain of Denso Airybees between 2006 and 2009.

Clubs
Kokugakuin Univ. Tochigi High School → Kaetujoshi college → Denso Airybees (2000–2009)

National team
 Universiade national team (1999,2001)

Honors
Team
Japan Volleyball League/V.League/V.Premier　Runners-up (1): 2007-2008
Kurowashiki All Japan Volleyball Championship　Champions (1): 2008
Individual
2008 2007-08 Premier.League Excellent player award
2009 2008-09 Premier.League Receive award

References

Japanese women's volleyball players
Living people
1979 births